Raymond W. Hurn (1921–2007) was a minister and general superintendent in the Church of the Nazarene.

References
 Church mourns the death of General Superintendent Emeritus Raymond W. Hurn. Church of the Nazarene, January 26, 2007. Accessed 2011-02-24.

1921 births
2007 deaths
American Nazarene ministers
Hurn, Raymod W.